Mirosław Włodarczyk (born 24 February 1959) is a retired Polish high jumper.

He won the bronze medal at the 1983 European Indoor Championships, and finished in joint fifth place at the 1984 European Indoor Championships,

His personal best jump was 2.26 metres, achieved in June 1983 in Kraków. He had 2.27 metres on the indoor track, achieved at the 1983 European Indoor Championships.

References

1959 births
Living people
Polish male high jumpers
Place of birth missing (living people)